Giuseppe Tresca (1710–1795) was an Italian painter, active in a late Baroque or Rococo style.

He was born in Sciacca, Sicily, but trained in Rome under Sebastiano Conca. He returned to become a respected painter in Palermo, where he became the master of Giuseppe Velazquez. He died in Palermo. He painted with Velazquez the nave ceiling of the Chiesa Madre of Castellamare del Golfo.

References

1710 births
1795 deaths
People from Sciacca
18th-century Italian painters
Italian male painters
Painters from Sicily
18th-century Italian male artists